"Easy/Lucky/Free" is a single by the band Bright Eyes from their album Digital Ash in a Digital Urn. It was released July 25, 2005. The music video features Conor Oberst entering a room, and then writing the lyrics and drawings on a transparent wall as the song plays. "Easy/Lucky/Free" is featured in the 2008 Mexican film Voy a Explotar.

Track listing
"Easy/Lucky/Free" - Radio Edit
"Gold Mine Gutted"
"Gold Mine Gutted" - Her Space Holiday Mix (packaging incorrectly lists "Easy/Lucky/Free" - Her Space Holiday Mix)

Official Versions
Album Version 5:32
Radio Edit 4:35
James Figurine Remix 4:48
Danger Mouse Remix 3:37
Dawes Cover 5:25

References

External links
 Listen to "Easy/Lucky/Free" on NPR's All Songs Considered (RealPlayer, Windows Media Player)
Music video for "Easy/Lucky/Free", directed by Lily Thorne with Lauri Faggioni

2005 singles
Bright Eyes (band) songs
Protest songs
Anti-war songs
Political songs
2005 songs
Saddle Creek Records singles
Songs written by Conor Oberst